The New Jersey Folk Festival (NJFF) is an annual folk music and cultural festival held at the Eagleton Institute of Politics (the Great Lawn) on the Douglass Campus at Rutgers University in New Brunswick, New Jersey on Rutgers Day. It is a free, non-profit family event held every year on the last Saturday in April from 10am - 6pm, rain or shine. It coincides with Rutgers Agricultural Field Day held on the adjacent Cook Campus. Beginning in 2009, both the New Jersey Folk Festival and Ag Field Day are held as a major part of Rutgers Day. This year's theme is On the Move: Transportation and Migration and will be taking place on Saturday, April 30th, 2022. The 48th annual NJFF is the first in-person festival since 2019, and was held virtually for the 2020 and 2021 festivals.

The American Studies Department of Rutgers, The State University of New Jersey is the presenting sponsor of the New Jersey Folk Festival.

The New Jersey Folk Festival, Inc. is also 501(c)(3) non-profit organization in the State of New Jersey exempt from federal taxation.

History 
Established in 1975, the New Jersey Folk Festival is the oldest continuously run folk festival in the State of New Jersey. Managed by a small team of Rutgers undergraduate students, the festival attracts over 15,000 people and is one of the City of New Brunswick's largest regularly scheduled events.

The mission of the New Jersey Folk Festival is to preserve and protect the music, culture, and arts of New Jersey. Therefore, the main focus of this festival is the traditional music, crafts, and foods of the diverse ethnic and cultural communities within the state and its surrounding region.

Typically, the event features three to four stages of music, dance, and workshops, a juried craft market, a children's activities area, a delicious array of food choices that offers everything from hamburgers, vegetarian fare, and funnel cake to a wide variety of ethnic foods, a folk marketplace, and a heritage area which offers a close-up look at each year's cultural or geographical theme or other appropriate exhibits.

Each year the festival strives for diversity in selecting performers, not only seeking out traditional "American" artists, but also reaching out via fieldwork to the many ethnic communities found within New Jersey. The annual ethnic or regional feature contributes an essential intimate connection to these varied cultural groups represented in the state's population.

The New Jersey Folk Festival is professionally supervised by Dr. Maria Kennedy and Co-Directors Dr. Carla Cevasco and Matt Hueston. It was founded by Dr. Angus Kress Gillespie. Each year also sees a Student Intern Team in positions including Stage Management, Outreach, Communications, Logistics, Curatorial Programs, Artists Relations, and more.

The following essays provide more information about the festival and its history:
 The Founding of the New Jersey Folk Festival by Dr. Angus Kress Gillespie, PhD
 Beyond the Ivory Tower by Dr. Angus Kress Gillespie, PhD
 Managing the New Jersey Folk Festival by Bill Seldon, NJFF Trustee

A Student-Run Event 

This festival is the end product of a class intended, in part, to provide students with leadership opportunities. The festival is one of only a handful in the United States managed by undergraduate students. Collectively, the staff is responsible for continuing the festival's mission of celebrating the diverse multicultural and indigenous folk life of New Jersey.

In 1975, when the festival first began, only two students were involved in its organization and management. Today, about ten students serve on the planning committee. Alumni of the festival also serve as advisors to the committee.

The class meets for three hours once a week under the direction of faculty advisor Dr. Maria Kennedy. During the first half of the class, there is academic instruction in which the students learn about folklore, including the distinction between "traditional" versus "revival" folk music, theoretical problems associated with publicly presenting ethnic culture, the history and aesthetic sensibilities of the craft presenters and performers, as well as more practical instruction in how to write press releases or conduct radio interviews. The second half of the class functions as a business meeting led by the festival manager, complete with progress reports from coordinators, "breakaway" management teamwork sessions, and problem-solving.

The student coordinators form a closely knit team, where they develop leadership and management skills, written and verbal communication, organization, personal assertiveness, and time management. The class is part of the curriculum of the American Studies Department of Rutgers, the State University of New Jersey.

Festival Areas

Skylands Stage 
The Skylands Stage is located in front of the Eagleton Institute. It offers music and dance presentations. The Opening Ceremony and the Awards Ceremony take place on this stage.

Shore Stage 
The Shore Stage is located between the Food Market and the Craft Market. It offers three jam sessions and performances by the annual Singer-Songwriter Showcase winners. The jam sessions include a Bluegass jam, an Old-Timey jam, and an Irish Seisiún.

Singer-Songwriter Showcase Contest 
While the main focus of the festival is indigenous folk forms passed down via family, home, and community traditions, the festival likes to recognize regional folk artists in an effort to foster and encourage "new" folk singer-songwriters in their contemporary society. Winners are given the opportunity to present their original material to a large, diversified audience of over 15,000 attendees. At least six winners are selected to perform 20 minute sets. Three slots are reserved exclusively for artists submitting through SonicBids.

The festival is especially interested in songs about the state of New Jersey. Though New Jersey has a diverse musical culture and history, it is the only state without a state song. The festival wishes to encourage singer-songwriters to develop material about its state.

Artists are permitted to sell CDs at Folk Marketplace and retain 100% of the profits from sales.

This contest is open only to singer-songwriters who have never before performed at the New Jersey Folk Festival. All entries must reflect original words and music. No instrumentals. Each artist must submit music and lyrics for three songs. All entry songs must be sung by the author. If selected, each artist agrees to perform only his or her own original material. No residency restrictions apply. Artists must agree to and be able to perform at the New Jersey Folk Festival to retain status as a winner.

The festival encourages electronic submission through SonicBids. The Electronic Press Kits (EPKs) of SonicBids are a faster, cheaper, and easier way to submit your material. The deadline to enter is mid-December.

EPKs can be submitted here:
 New Jersey Folk Festival's Singer-Songwriter Showcase

Pinelands Stage 
The Pinelands Stage is located between the Gatehouse and the Craft Market. This stage is exclusively a workshop area where instruction, demonstration, participation and performance are offered.

Heritage Area 
The Heritage Area comprises appropriate craft demonstrations and exhibits related to the current festival theme with one or two traditional "American" craft demonstrators.

Craft Market 
The Craft Market consists of about 100 vendors. The focus of the juried craft market is on traditional folk art crafts. The work of each vendor has been pre-screened for top-notch quality as well as traditional nature. Crafts include jewelry, woodwork, pottery, ceramics, clothing, clothwork, etc.

Food Vendor Arc 
The Food Vendor Arc consists of about two dozen diversified ethnic and traditional "American" food vendors located in a semi-circular arc between the Skylands and Shore Stages near the Loree Building.

Children's Activities Area 
The Children's Activities Area offers a wide variety of free activities including games, face painting, take-home crafts, pie-eating contests, and pony rides.

Folk Marketplace 
At Folk Marketplace, personnel can answer general inquiries about the festival. You can pick up a festival performance schedule or purchase merchandise, including performer CDs, festival T-shirts, magnets, or keychains.

Festival Logo 
The Jersey Devil serves as the official logo of the New Jersey Folk Festival. However, every year, a new logo embodying the current year's festival highlight is designed and used.

Original Logo 
The original festival logo was the rooster. Back in 1975, the festival was managed by three people; Professor Gillespie as the Director, Kathy DeAngelo as the music coordinator, and Barbara Irwin as the crafts coordinator. When choosing a logo, the original committee turned to the folk art collection of the Newark Museum. There they found the cock weathervane made of copper in 19th century rural New Jersey. They felt that this rooster served as a fine symbol of the folk culture found in New Jersey in earlier days.

Erwin Christensen in The Index of American Design explains that the rooster is probably the earliest weathervane design in the United States. This preference may be explained by the widespread use of this symbol on church steeples in Europe. According to tradition, the cock owed its place on church spires to Peter's denial of Christ. Hence, it served as a warning to the congregation not to do the same. In the Bayeux Tapestry of the 1070s, originally of the Bayeux Cathedral (Cathédrale Notre-Dame de Bayeux) and now exhibited at Musée de la Tapisserie de Bayeux in Bayeux, Normandy, there is a depiction of a man installing a cock on Westminster Abbey. Also it is reputed through Papal enactment that in the 9th century Pope Nicholas I ordered the figure to be placed on every church steeple and even previous to that Pope Leo IV had it placed on the Old St. Peter's Basilica or old Constantinian basilica even before Nicholas I was Pope.

Upcoming Festival Highlights 
 April 26, 2014- 40th Anniversary Celebration

Previous Festival Highlights 
 2022- On the Move: Transportation and Migration
 2021- Oaxaca
 2020- Oaxaca
2019- Best of the past 4 years (45th Annual)
 2018- Native Americans of New Jersey
 2017- Turkish Traditions
 2016- Bluegrass Showcase
 2015- Maritime
 2014- 40th Anniversary
 2013- Garifuna Folk Culture
 2012- Bulgarian Folk Culture
 2011- Kalmyk Folk Culture
 2010- The Andes
 2009- 35th Anniversary Celebration
 2008- German-American Traditions
 2007- Dominican-American Traditions
 2006- Charm of Korea
 2005- Norwegian-American Traditions
 2004- 30th Anniversary Celebration
 2003- Mexican-American Traditions
 2002- Blues & Gospel
 2001- Portuguese-American Traditions
 2000- Women in Folk
 1999- Silver Jubilee Celebration
 1998- Chinese-American Traditions
 1997- India
 1996- South Jersey
 1995- Puerto Rico
 1994- 20th Anniversary Celebration
 1993- Lebanon
 1992- American Indians
 1991- Haiti
 1990- Greece
 1989- Ireland
 1988- Sweden
 1987- Philippines
 1986- Italy
 1985- Scottish Traditions in America
 1984- Cuban Ties
 1983- Hungarian-Americans
 1982- Holland-American Culture
 1981- 200 Years of NJ Agriculture
 1980- New Brunswick Folklore
 1979- Folk Heritage
 1978- Folk Heritage 
 1977- Folk Heritage
 1976- Folk Heritage
 1975- Folk Heritage

External links 
Official New Jersey Folk Festival Website
New Jersey Folk Festival Facebook Page
New Jersey Folk Festival Twitter
New Jersey Folk Festival Instagram
"New Jersey Folk" Podcast

References 

Tourist attractions in New Brunswick, New Jersey
Music festivals in New Jersey
Folk festivals in the United States